Epicratinus is a genus of spiders in the family Zodariidae. It was first described in 2005 by Jocqué & Baert.

Species 
 it contains sixteen species, found in South America:

 Epicratinus amazonicus Jocqué & Baert, 2005 (type) – Brazil
 Epicratinus anakin Gonçalves & Brescovit, 2020 – Brazil
 Epicratinus dookan Gonçalves & Brescovit, 2020 – Brazil
 Epicratinus ehonda Gonçalves & Brescovit, 2020 – Brazil
 Epicratinus mauru Gonçalves & Brescovit, 2020 – Brazil
 Epicratinus omegarugal Gonçalves & Brescovit, 2020 – Brazil
 Epicratinus pegasus Gonçalves & Brescovit, 2020 – Brazil
 Epicratinus perfidus (Jocqué & Baert, 2002) – Bolivia, Brazil
 Epicratinus petropolitanus (Mello-Leitão, 1922) – Brazil
 Epicratinus pikachu Gonçalves & Brescovit, 2020 – Brazil
 Epicratinus pugionifer Jocqué & Baert, 2005 – Brazil
 Epicratinus stitch Gonçalves & Brescovit, 2020 – Brazil
 Epicratinus takutu Jocqué & Baert, 2005 – Guyana, Brazil
 Epicratinus vader Gonçalves & Brescovit, 2020 – Brazil
 Epicratinus zangief Gonçalves & Brescovit, 2020 – Brazil
 Epicratinus zelda Gonçalves & Brescovit, 2020 – Brazil

References

Zodariidae
Araneomorphae genera
Spiders of South America